John Barton may refer to:

Arts and entertainment
John Barton (writer), 15th century English writer on Lollardy
John Barton (director) (1928–2018), English theatre director and founding member of the Royal Shakespeare Company
John Barton (poet) (born 1957), Canadian poet

Law and politics
John Barton (MP) (1614–1684), English lawyer and politician who sat in the House of Commons in 1659 and 1660
John Barton (public administrator) (1875–1961), New Zealand accountant, writer, lawyer, magistrate and public administrator
John J. Barton (1906–2004), Mayor of Indianapolis

Religion
John Barton (missionary) (1836–1908), English Anglican priest
John Barton (priest) (born 1936), British Anglican priest
John Barton (theologian) (born 1948), British theologian and professor

Sports
John Barton (footballer, born 1866) (1866–1910), English international footballer
John Barton (footballer, born 1953), English footballer
John Barton (rugby league), English rugby league footballer

Others
John Barton (Quaker) (1755–1789), English abolitionist
John Barton (engineer) (1771–1834), English engineer noted for his engravings using his Ruling Engine
John Barton (economist) (1789–1852), English economist
John Rhea Barton (1794–1871), American orthopedic surgeon
John Kennedy Barton (1853–1921), Rear Admiral in the United States Navy
John Barton (businessman) (1944–2021), English businessman, chairman of Next plc and EasyJet
John P. Barton, British and American applied nuclear scientist

Characters
John Barton (Emmerdale), a fictional character in British soap Emmerdale
John Barton, a fictional character in Mrs. Gaskell's short story Mary Barton
John Barton, a fictional character in Looking for Alibrandi

See also
Jack Barton (disambiguation)
John de Barton, 14th century English judge